Virginia Bonci-Joan (5 January 1949 – 9 November 2020) was a Romanian track and field athlete who specialised in the high jump. She competed in the women's high jump at the 1968 Summer Olympics.

References

1949 births
2020 deaths
Athletes (track and field) at the 1968 Summer Olympics
Romanian female high jumpers
Olympic athletes of Romania
Place of birth missing
Universiade medalists in athletics (track and field)
Universiade gold medalists for Romania